Prakash Amritraj (born October 2, 1983) is an American former professional tennis player, who represented India in international tournaments. He is the son of former Indian tennis player Vijay Amritraj.

Background
Prakash Amritraj is the son of Indian tennis player Vijay Amritraj and Shyamala, a Sri Lankan Tamil.

Prakash is the paternal cousin of fellow tour pro Stephen Amritraj, whose father Anand and paternal uncle Ashok were former professional tennis players representing India. Prakash has one brother, Vikram, who was born in 1987.

He played 2 years of college tennis for the University of Southern California.

Professional career
In 2007, Amritraj won three straight ITF Pro Circuit tournaments in India, beating Karan Rastogi in all three finals.

On July 14, 2008 Amritraj played in his first ATP Tour final, losing to Fabrice Santoro from France in straight sets.

From August 2010 to August 2012, Amritraj was inactive on the tour. However, he returned to the court for the first time in just over two years when he competed as a wildcard in a qualifier at the 2012 Comerica Bank Challenger in Aptos, California.

Prakash Amritraj joined the staff of the Tennis Channel in 2016 as one of the network’s primary travel reporters and also as an in-match analyst and a host both in studio and at worldwide events.  In February 2021, his contract was renewed for an additional three years through 2023.

ATP career finals

Singles: 1 (1 runner-up)

Doubles: 1 (1 runner-up)

ATP Challenger and ITF Futures finals

Singles: 7 (4–3)

Doubles: 14 (8–6)

Performance timeline

Singles

References

External links
 
 
 
 Amritraj World Ranking History

1983 births
Living people
Tennis players from Los Angeles
People from Encino, Los Angeles
American male tennis players
Indian male tennis players
American people of Indian Tamil descent
American sportspeople of Indian descent
American people of Sri Lankan Tamil descent
Indian-American tennis players
University of Southern California alumni
USC Trojans men's tennis players
American expatriates in India
Tamil sportspeople
Amritraj family